The 1958–59 Cypriot Cup was the 19th edition of the Cypriot Cup. A total of 18 clubs entered the competition. It began on 9 April 1959 with the first round and concluded on 27 June 1959 with the final which was held at GSP Stadium. Anorthosis Famagusta won their 2nd Cypriot Cup trophy after beating AEL Limassol 1–0 in the final.

First round 

1AEL qualified on draw

Quarter-finals 

Συμπληρωματικός αγώνας

Semi-finals

Final

Sources

Bibliography

See also 
 Cypriot Cup

Cypriot Cup seasons
1958–59 domestic association football cups
1958–59 in Cypriot football